A prima facie right is a right that can be outweighed by other considerations. It stands in contrast with absolute rights, which cannot be outweighed by anything. Some authors consider an absolute right as a prima facie right, but one that cannot be outweighed in any possible situation. It is also maintained that all men always have a prima facie rights to liberty, security, and life but they do not constitute actual rights if there are stronger prima facie rights or moral considerations that supervene. An act may also be viewed as prima facie right but viewed in others as prima facie wrong.

See also
Natural and legal rights
Political ethics
 Prima facie
Proportionalism
Situational ethics

References

http://www.blackwellreference.com/public/tocnode?id=g9781405106795_chunk_g978140510679519_ss1-125 Retrieved 25 May 2009
http://www.onlineethics.org/cms/13822.aspx] Ethics Online Retrieved 25 May 2009

Rights